Nizhegorodskaya is an elevated station on the Moscow Central Circle of the Moscow Metro that opened in September 2016. The station is named for the Nizhegorodsky District in Moscow. The named was changed prior to opening from Ryazanskaya.

Nizhegorodskaya is a part of an eponymous transport hub with transfer to the Gorkovsky suburban railway line (opened in January 2020) and the underground metro station of the Nekrasovskaya line (opened in March 2020). Connection to the underground Bolshaya Koltsevaya line is scheduled to open in 2022.

Gallery

References

External links 
 mkzd.ru

Moscow Metro stations
Railway stations in Russia opened in 2016
Moscow Central Circle stations